Afrowatsonius is a genus of tiger moths in the family Erebidae.

Species
 Afrowatsonius burgeoni (Talbot, 1928)
 Afrowatsonius fulvomarginalis (Wichgraf, 1921)
 Afrowatsonius marginalis (Walker, 1855)
 Afrowatsonius spilleri (Bethune-Baker, 1908)
 Afrowatsonius sudanicus (Rothschild, 1933)

References 
 , 2006: New genera and species of Arctiinae from the Afrotropical fauna (Lepidoptera: Arctiidae. Nachrichten des Entomologische Vereins Apollo 27 (3): 139-152.
 , 2010: Beitrag zur afrotropische Arctiidaefauna: Bemerkungen und Korrekturen zum Artenspektrum der Genera Creatonotos Hübner, [1819], Afrowatsonius Dubatolov, 2006 und Dubatolovia gen. n. (Lepidoptera: Arctiidae, Arctiinae). Nachrichten des Entomologische Vereins Apollo 31 (1/2): 1-8.

Spilosomina
Moth genera